Emmanuel Oko-Jaja is an Anglican bishop in Nigeria: he is the current Bishop of Niger Delta West one of nine in the  Anglican Province of the Niger Delta, itself one of 14 within the Church of Nigeria.

Notes

Anglican bishops of Niger Delta West